Elijah Boothe is an American actor best known for his role in Netflix's Luke Cage where he plays the young Cottonmouth. Boothe has appeared in numerous television shows and feature films including Golden Boy, Blue Bloods, and the Netflix original film Coin Heist. He has won award for "Best Actor" from the San Diego Black Film Festival.

Raised in Jackson Township, New Jersey, Boothe attended the OCVTS Performing Arts Academy in Lakehurst, New Jersey.

Boothe is also a singer, and has performed for the House of Parliament, Radio Disney, the Apollo Theater, and at the U.S. Open.

Filmography

Film

Television

References

External links

American male web series actors
21st-century American male actors
American male television actors
American male film actors
Living people
Year of birth missing (living people)
Place of birth missing (living people)
Actors from New Jersey
People from Jackson Township, New Jersey
Singers from New Jersey
African-American male actors
21st-century African-American male singers
21st-century American male singers
21st-century American singers